Taylor Company, previously known as Taylor Freezer Corporation, is an American manufacturer of food service equipment located in Rockton, Illinois. They are known as the supplier and maker of several machines that McDonald's uses, including their grills and many of their ice cream machines.  Although known for soft serve machines, the company also offers commercial grills, frozen and carbonated beverage units, frozen cocktail machines, batch freezers, smoothie equipment, and shake equipment.

Company history 

The company was founded in 1926 by Charles Taylor, a third-generation ice cream maker from Buffalo, New York, who invented an automated countertop ice cream freezer that allowed restaurants to manufacture their own ice cream from mix. The machine stores liquid ingredients in a hopper and freezes them in another chamber. Blades scrape the frozen product off the walls and send it to a nozzle. Taylor's invention has been reported as the first soft serve ice cream machine. Inventor L.A.M. Phelan became the company's president in 1928. From 1945 to 1955, Taylor Freezer Corp. franchised the Zesto Drive-In restaurant concept, which was centered around the "Zest-O-Mat" frozen custard machine that Phelan developed and Taylor sold. In 1945, Phelan organized Tekni-Craft, a pioneering worker cooperative that operated Taylor's manufacturing facilities.

The company was acquired by Beatrice Foods in 1967. In 1985, the company was sold to Specialty Equipment Companies along with other former Beatrice operations. Specialty Equipment Companies was purchased by United Technologies in 2000 and merged into its Carrier unit. Middleby Corporation of Elgin, Illinois, acquired Taylor from United Technologies' UTC Climate, Controls & Security division in 2018 in a deal valued at $1 billion.

Equipment is not sold directly from the manufacturing location, but the company operates using a distribution system model with distributors based around the world.  The company has a support network for installation and maintenance of their machines.

Contract with McDonald's

In 1956, the company made a handshake agreement with Ray Kroc of McDonald's Corporation to supply milkshake machines for the fast food chain. As of 2021, the Taylor C602 digital ice cream machine is found in more than 13,000 McDonald's locations in the United States and many more around the world.  Taylor ice cream machines can make milkshakes, soft serve ice cream, sundaes, and the McFlurry dessert; rather than use gravity, they actively pump the ice cream material through it, allowing far higher throughput and production than "standard" ice cream machines. 

In 2017, McDonald's announced that it had a contract with the Italian company Carpigiani for new ice cream machines; franchisees can purchase either the Taylor machines or Carpigiani's machines.

The Taylor ice cream machines used by McDonald's have an automated daily cleaning mode that heats a sanitizer to high temperatures for four hours. This is part of an 11-step cleaning process that, when performed incorrectly, can cause the machine to be unable to be in service until a Taylor repairman services the machine. A study in 2000 found that 25% of the machines installed in McDonald's were not functioning.  A technology company called Kytch sold Raspberry Pi based devices to McDonald's franchisees in 2020 that assisted in identifying repairs needed and making immediate downtime notifications using the machine's internal data. McDonald's corporate office discouraged use of the device and noted that Taylor was creating a similar device. In early March 2022, Kytch announced they would be suing McDonald’s for $900 million in damages due to McDonald's telling franchisees to quit using Kytch. The case has become a cause for the electronics right to repair movement.

Software engineer Rashiq Zahid developed a website, McBroken.com, to track the downtime and state of the machines throughout the US.  In September 2021, it was announced that the Federal Trade Commission is investigating the alleged frequent breakdowns of the machines.

References

Book sources

External links
 

Manufacturing companies established in 1926
Companies based in Winnebago County, Illinois
Manufacturing companies based in Illinois
1926 establishments in Illinois
Food and drink companies established in 1926